The Basilischi is an organized crime group based in Basilicata, Southern Italy, officially formed in 1994 by Giovanni Luigi Cosentino in Potenza.

On 22 April 1999, 84 orders for pre-trial custody were issued by the Prosecutor's Office  in Potenza. That started what became known as the "maxi-trial", which jailed the main figures of the Basilischi and demonstrated their existence and strength in Basilicata. The maxi-trial concluded in 2007, with a 700-page summation by the judges and the sentencing of 26 people for mafia association to a total of 242 years in prison. 

The conviction of many high-profile members of the clan caused the group to become fractured and fall further under the influence of the more powerful Calabrian-based 'Ndrangheta.

References

1994 establishments in Italy
1999 disestablishments in Italy
Organised crime groups in Italy
Secret societies related to organized crime